USS Dart was a captured Confederate schooner acquired by the Union Navy during the American Civil War. She was put into service  by the Union Navy to serve as a tender for other Union Navy ships. However, she was also able to capture several "prizes" on her own before she was dismantled and scrapped.

Service history 

Dart was a small schooner captured by the screw steamer South Carolina off Galveston, Texas, on 4 July 1861. Though never labeled or purchased by the Navy, she was armed with a 12-pounder howitzer, and cruised as tender to both South Carolina and the screw steamer Huntsville. During her brief service, she captured several small vessels, including schooners Cecilia on 24 September 1861,  and Zavala on 1 October. Dart was taken out of service, and dismantled by men from the screw frigate Niagara off the southwest pass of the Mississippi River, between 19 and 21 October 1861.

References 
 

Ships of the Union Navy
Schooners of the United States Navy
Tenders of the United States Navy
Gunboats of the United States Navy
American Civil War patrol vessels of the United States